Season by season results for Boldklubben Frem.

Domestic results

1880s

1890s

1900s

1910s

1920s

1930s

1940s

1950s

1960s

1970s

1980s

1990s

2000s

2010s

International results

Inter-Cities Fairs Cup

1967–68

1st round 

Athletic Bilbao won 4-2 on aggregate

UEFA Cup Winners' Cup

1969–70

1st round 

St. Gallen 2-2 Frem on aggregate. St. Gallen won on away goals.

1978–79

1st round 

AS Nancy-Lorraine won 4-2 on aggregate.

UEFA Cup

1972–73

1st round 

Boldklubben Frem won 5-2 on aggregate.

2nd round 

Twente won 9-0 on aggregate.

1977–78

1st round 

Grasshoppers won 8-1 on aggregate.

1992–93

1st round 

Boldklubben Frem won 6-3 on aggregate.

2nd round 

Real Zaragoza won 6-1 on aggregate.

Footnotes

External links
Frem's league, cup and european matches 1945-2007 at bkfrem.dk
Copenhagen Championships and National Playoffs 1889-1927 at RSSSF
Danish League Tables 1927-1998 at RSSSF
Denmark – List of Cup Finals at RSSSF
Denmark – List of Topscorers at RSSSF
 Frem at haslund.info
 The Danish Cup at haslund.info

Seasons
Frem, Boldklubben
Frem, Boldklubben